Mark or Marc O'Leary may refer to:

 Mark O'Leary (cricket coach) (born 1976)
 Mark O'Leary (hurler) (born 1977)
 Marc O'Leary, perpetrator in the Washington and Colorado serial rape cases